The Blind Cattle King is a 1912 silent film drama short directed by Romaine Fielding and produced by the Lubin Manufacturing Company at their studio in Prescott, Arizona. It starred Fielding and stage actress Mary Ryan, now performing in films.

Cast
Romaine Fielding - Don Romero
Mary Ryan - Maud Barnes

References

External links
 The Blind Cattle King at IMDb.com

1912 films
American silent short films
1912 short films
Films directed by Romaine Fielding
Lubin Manufacturing Company films
American black-and-white films
Silent American drama films
1912 drama films
1910s American films